A fraction is one or more equal parts of something.

Fraction may also refer to:
 Fraction (chemistry), a quantity of a substance collected by fractionation
 Fraction (floating point number), an (ambiguous) term sometimes used to specify a part of a floating point number
 Fraction (politics), a subgroup within a parliamentary party
 Fraction (radiation therapy), one unit of treatment of the total radiation dose of radiation therapy that is split into multiple treatment sessions
 Fraction (religion), the ceremonial act of breaking the bread during Christian Communion

People with the surname
 Matt Fraction, a comic book author

See also
 Algebraic fraction, an indicated division in which the divisor, or both dividend and divisor, are algebraic expressions
 Irrational fraction, a type of algebraic fraction
 Faction (disambiguation)
 Frazione, a type of administrative division of an Italian commune
 Free and Independent Fraction, a Romanian political party
 Part (disambiguation)
 Ratio